Wipp Valley is a district in the northern part of the Italian province of South Tyrol. It comprises the South Tyrolean part of the larger geographically defined Wipptal, stretching from Brenner Pass in the north down the upper Eisack (Isarco) river to Franzensfeste in the south. It was separated from neighbouring Eisacktal district in 1980.

Overview
According to the 2001 census, 85.31% of the population of the valley speak German, 14.32% Italian and 0.37% Ladin as mother language.

The following six municipalities are part of the district of the Wipp Valley:
Brenner
Freienfeld
Franzensfeste
Ratschings
Pfitsch
Sterzing (district capital)

References

External links

Wipptal district 

Districts of South Tyrol

it:Alta Valle Isarco
sl:Dolina Wipptal